Belye Prudy is a rural locality (a settlement) and the administrative center of Beloprudskoye Rural Settlement, Danilovsky District, Volgograd Oblast, Russia. The population was 551 as of 2010. There are 13 streets.

Geography 
Belye Prudy is located in steppe, 48 km north of Danilovka (the district's administrative centre) by road. Velichkin is the nearest rural locality.

References 

Rural localities in Danilovsky District, Volgograd Oblast